Charles Herron Fairbanks (June 3, 1913 – July 17, 1984) was an archaeologist/anthropologist. He conducted archaeology at the Ocmulgee National Monument in Macon, Georgia where he developed rigorous, painstaking field methodology. His 1967-1969 excavations on the slave cabins at Kingsley Plantation, Fort George Island, Florida—the southernmost of the Sea Islands—were the first of their kind in the United States. Undertaken to "learn more about slave life," he called his practice "Plantation Archaeology," and for more than a decade the graduate program he led at the University of Florida was the only one in the nation with a concentration in African American archaeology.

Biography
He was born on June 3, 1913, in Bainbridge, New York. He served in the United States Army from 1943 to 1945.

He worked on the Tennessee Valley Authority archaeology projects during his college years in 1937 and 1938.  He graduated in 1939.  He later went on to the University of Michigan graduate school.  Later he became the superintendent at Fort Frederica National Monument and was eventually a professor at University of Florida, Gainesville.

In 1983 Fairbanks received the J. C. Harrington Award, presented by the Society for Historical Archaeology for his life-time contributions to archaeology centered on scholarship.

Charles Herron Fairbanks died on July 17, 1984.

Publications
Archaeology of the Funeral Mound: Ocmulgee National Monument, George (1956, reprinted 2003)
The Occurrence of Coiled Pottery in New York
The Plantation Archaeology of the Southeast Coast
The Florida Seminole People (1975)
Florida Archaeology w/Jerald Milanich (1987)

References

http://www.mnsu.edu
http://www.georgiaencyclopedia.org 
Georgia Archaeology Who's Who

1913 births
1984 deaths
University of Florida faculty
University of Michigan alumni
20th-century American writers
20th-century American male writers
 
20th-century American archaeologists
20th-century American anthropologists
United States Army personnel of World War II